Chaupijanca or Chaupi Janca (possibly from Quechua chawpi central, middle, hanka snowcapped ridge or peak; ice, "central ridge (or peak)") is a  mountain in the Huallanca (or Chaupijanca) mountain range in the Andes of Peru. It is located in the Ancash Region, Bolognesi Province, in the districts of Huallanca and Huasta.

References 

Mountains of Peru
Mountains of Ancash Region
Glaciers of Peru